A ticker symbol or stock symbol is an abbreviation used to uniquely identify publicly traded shares of a particular stock on a particular stock market. In short, ticker symbols are arrangements of symbols or characters (generally Latin letters or digits) representing specific assets or securities listed on a stock exchange or traded publicly. A stock symbol may consist of letters, numbers, or a combination of both. "Ticker symbol" refers to the symbols that were printed on the ticker tape of a ticker tape machine.

Interpreting the symbol
Stock symbols are unique identifiers assigned to each security traded on a particular market. A stock symbol can consist of letters, numbers, or a combination of both, and is a way to uniquely identify that stock.  The symbols were kept as short as possible to reduce the number of characters that had to be printed on the ticker tape, and to make it easy to recognize by traders and investors.

The allocation of symbols and formatting conventions is specific to each stock exchange.  In the US, for example, stock tickers are typically between 1 and 4 letters and represent the company name where possible.  For example, US-based computer company stock Apple Inc. traded on the NASDAQ exchange has the symbol AAPL, while the motor company Ford's stock that is traded on the New York Stock Exchange has the single-letter ticker F.  In Europe, most exchanges use three-letter codes; for example, Dutch consumer goods company Unilever traded on the Amsterdam Euronext exchange has the symbol UNA.  In Asia, numbers are often used as stock tickers to avoid issues for international investors when using non-Latin scripts.  For example, the bank HSBC's stock traded on the Hong Kong Stock Exchange has the ticker symbol 0005.

Symbols sometimes change to reflect mergers. Prior to the 1999 merger with Mobil Oil, Exxon used a phonetic spelling of the company "XON" as its ticker symbol.  The symbol of the firm after the merger was "XOM".  Symbols are sometimes reused. In the US the single-letter symbols are particularly sought after as vanity symbols.  For example, since March of 2008 Visa Inc. has used the symbol V that had previously been used by Vivendi which had delisted and given up the symbol.

To fully qualify a stock, both the ticker and the exchange or country of listing needs to be known. On many systems both must be specified to uniquely identify the security.  This is often done by appending the location or exchange code to the ticker.

Other identifiers 
Although stock tickers identify a security, they are exchange dependent, generally limited to stocks, and can change.  These limitations have led to the development of other codes in financial markets to identify securities for settlement purposes.  The most prevalent of these is the International Securities Identifying Number (ISIN).  An ISIN uniquely identifies a security and its structure is defined in ISO 6166.  Securities for which ISINs are issued include bonds, commercial paper, stocks, and warrants.  The ISIN code is a 12-character alpha-numerical code that does not contain information characterizing financial instruments, but serves for uniform identification of a security at trading and settlement.

The ISIN identifies the security, not the exchange (if any) on which it trades; it is, therefore, not a replacement for the ticker symbol. For instance, Daimler AG stock trades on twenty-two different stock exchanges worldwide and is priced in five foreign currencies; it has the same ISIN on each (DE0007100000), though not the same ticker symbol. ISIN cannot specify a particular trade in this case, and another identifier, typically the three- or four-letter exchange code (such as the Market Identifier Code), will have to be specified in addition to the ISIN.

Symbol for stock market indices
While usually a stock ticker identifies a security that can be traded, stock market indices are also sometimes assigned a symbol, even though they can generally not be traded. Symbols for indices are usually distinguished by adding a symbol in front of the name, such as a circumflex (or 'caret')  or a dot. For example, Reuters lists the Nasdaq Composite index under the symbol .IXIC.

Symbols by country

Australia 

In Australia the Australian Securities Exchange  uses the following conventions:
Three character base symbol with the first and third character being alphanumeric and the second alphabetic. ETFs and ETMFs can be either 3 or 4 characters.  Exchange-traded warrants and exchange-traded options are six characters. ETOs can have numbers in the sixth character.

Canada 
In Canada the Toronto Stock Exchange TSX and the TSXV use the following special codes after the ticker symbol:

United Kingdom
In the United Kingdom, prior to 1996, stock codes were known as EPICs, named after the London Stock Exchange's Exchange Price Information Computer (e.g.: "MKS" for Marks and Spencer).  Following the introduction of the Sequence trading platform in 1996, EPICs were renamed Tradable Instrument Display Mnemonics (TIDM), but they are still widely referred to as EPICs.  Stocks can also be identified using their SEDOL (Stock Exchange Daily Official List) number or their ISIN (International Securities Identification Number).

United States
In the United States, modern letter-only ticker symbols were developed by Standard & Poor's (S&P) to bring a national standard to investing. Previously, a single company could have many ticker symbols as they varied between the dozens of individual stock markets.  The term ticker refers to the noise made by the ticker tape machines once widely used by stock exchanges.

The S&P system was later standardized by the securities industry and modified as the years passed. Stock symbols for preferred stock have not been standardized.

Some companies use a well-known product as their ticker symbol. Belgian brewer AB InBev, the brewer of Budweiser beer, uses "BUD" (symbolizing its premier product in the United States) as its three-letter ticker for American Depository Receipts. Its rival, the Molson Coors Brewing Company, uses a similarly beer-related symbol, "TAP". Likewise, Southwest Airlines pays tribute to its headquarters at Love Field in Dallas through its "LUV" symbol. Cedar Fair Entertainment Company, which operates large amusement parks in the United States, uses "FUN" as its symbol. Harley-Davidson uses "HOG", an abbreviation for the corporate-sponsored Harley Owners Group.  Yamana Gold uses "AUY", because on the periodic table of elements, "Au" is the symbol for gold.  Sotheby's (the famous auction house) uses the symbol "BID".  Petco uses the symbol "WOOF," a reference to the sound made by dogs.

While most symbols come from the company's name, sometimes it happens the other way around. Tricon Global, owner of KFC, Pizza Hut and Taco Bell, adopted the symbol "YUM" to represent its corporate mission when the company was spun out of PepsiCo in 1997. In 2002, the company changed its name to match its symbol, adopting the name Yum! Brands.

Symbols sometimes change to reflect mergers. Before the 1999 merger with Mobil, Exxon used a phonetic spelling of the company "XON" as its ticker symbol. The symbol of the firm after the merger was "XOM". After Hewlett-Packard merged with Compaq, the new firm took on the ticker symbol "HPQ". (The former symbols were HWP and CPQ.) AT&T's ticker symbol is "T"; accordingly, the company is referred to simply as "Telephone" on Wall Street (the T symbol is so well known that when SBC purchased the company, it took the AT&T name, capitalizing on its history and keeping the desired single letter symbol).

Some examples of US Stock symbols include:

 A – Agilent Technologies
 AAPL – Apple
 BRK.(A/B) - Berkshire Hathaway (Class A or B shares marked by a letter following period, BRK.A or BRK.B)
 C – Citigroup
 GOOG – Alphabet (parent company of Google)
 HOG – Harley-Davidson
 HPQ - Hewlett-Packard
 INTC – Intel
 KO – The Coca-Cola Company  
 LUV - Southwest Airlines (after their main hub at Love Field)
 MMM – 3M (originally known as Minnesota Mining and Manufacturing)
 MSFT – Microsoft
 T - AT&T
 TGT – Target Corporation
 TXN – Texas Instruments
 XOM - ExxonMobil
 WOOF - Petco
 WMT – Walmart

Formerly, a glance at a U.S. stock symbol and its appended codes would allow an investor to determine where a stock trades; however, in July 2007, the SEC approved a rule change allowing companies moving from the New York Stock Exchange to the Nasdaq to retain their three-letter symbols; DirecTV was one of the first companies to make this move.  When first implemented, the rule change did not apply to companies with one or two-letter symbols, but subsequently any stock was able to move from the NYSE to the Nasdaq without changing its symbol. CA Technologies, which traded under the symbol CA before it was acquired in 2018, moved from the NYSE to the Nasdaq in April 2008 and kept its two-letter symbol.

Single-letter NYSE ticker symbols
 A: Agilent Technologies (previously used by Anaconda Copper, American Medical Buildings, Attwoods and Astra AB)
 B: Barnes Group (previously used by Bankers Utilities Corporation and Baldwin Lima Hamilton)
 C: Citigroup (previously used by Chrysler)
 D: Dominion Energy (previously used by Douglas Aircraft Company and Dart Industries)
 E: Eni (previously used by Erie Lackawanna Railway and Transco Energy Co.)
 F: Ford
 G: Genpact (previously used by Greyhound Dial Corporation and Gillette)
 H: Hyatt (previously used by Hupp Corporation, Hardee's, Harcourt General, Helm Resources and Realogy)
 J: Jacobs Engineering Group (previously used by J Net Enterprises and Standard Oil Co. of New Jersey)
 K: Kellogg's
 L: Loews Corporation (previously used by Liberty Financial Companies, Sinclair Oil Corp, and Liberty Media)
 M: Macy's Inc (previously used by Marcor)
 O: Realty Income Corporation (previously used by Odetics)
 R: Ryder (previously used by Uniroyal and LF Rothschild)
S: SentinelOne (previously used by Sprint Corporation and Sears)
 T: AT&T (previously used by AT&T Corporation)
 U: Unity Software (previously used by US Airways)
 V: Visa (previously used by Vivendi, New York, New Haven & Hartford Railroad, Irving Bank, Vivra and Viking General)
 W: Wayfair (previously used by Westvaco)
 X: US Steel
 Y: Alleghany Corporation

Unassigned letters: 
 I: previously used by Intelsat, Itel Corporation, and First Interstate Bancorp
 N: previously used by Inco and NetSuite
 P: previously used by Pandora and Phillips Petroleum Company.
 Q: previously used by Quintiles and Qwest
 Z: previously used by Woolworth Corporation

Single-letter NASDAQ ticker symbols
 Z: Zillow

Unassigned letters: 
 A–Y

Other countries
In countries where Arabic script is used, and in East Asia, transliterated Latin script versions of company names may be confusing to an unpracticed Western reader; stock symbols provide a simple means of clear communication in the workplace. Many Asian countries use numerical or alphanumerical ticker symbols of only digits and Roman letters to facilitate international trade.

 Industrial and Commercial Bank of China – 01398 [Hong Kong]
 HSBC – 00005 [Hong Kong];  in the London Stock Exchange, it is HSBA, for Hong Kong Shanghai Bank, Class A)
 DBS Bank – D05 [Singapore]
 Jardine C&C – C07 [Singapore]
 TonenGeneral Sekiyu KK – 5012 [Japan]
 Toshiba Corp – 6502 [Japan]
 China CITIC Bank Corp Ltd – 601998 [Shanghai – China]
 Hubei Golden Ring Co Ltd – 000615 [Shenzhen – China]
 ASUSTeK – 2357 [Taiwan]
 Chunghwa Telecom Co Ltd – 2412 [Taiwan]
 Saudi Electricity Company - 5110 [Saudi Arabia]

See also
 CUSIP
 Market identification code
 Option symbol
 SEDOL
 ISIN
 Wertpapierkennnummer

References

 

Financial metadata
Encodings
Stock market
Security identifier types